Felix is a British producer and DJ. He is known for his hit track "Don't You Want Me" and his underground house project "The Party Crashers".

Life and career
Felix was born in Chelmsford, Essex. His passion for music began early with a love of Soul & Funk from the "Street Sounds" compilations and the House Sound of Chicago. At the age of 15, after exploring a brief interest in Hip Hop, he decided to create his own music and began getting involved with DJing.
 
After a handful of releases, Felix's 1992 track "Don't You Want Me" changed his career. In an interview with AXS celebrating the track's 23 year release, Felix said he "was working a 9-to-5 job when the song first came out. It was just such a massive, massive hit. It caught a lot of people off guard and it changed [his] life completely because [he] jumped into it full-time... making music, then touring, DJing, and producing." The track, which sampled Jomanda's "Don't You Want My Love" (remixed by Rollo and Red Jerry), went to number one on the Billboard European Hot 100 Singles and Hot Dance Music/Club Play charts. It also reached number 6 in the UK Singles Chart in 1992. A remix of the song,"Don't You Want Me: Pugilist Mix", formed the soundtrack to the 1997 TV commercial for Blackcurrant Tango. "Don't You Want Me" was also sampled by David Guetta and Snoop Dogg on their collaboration "Wet" in 2011.

"Don't You Want Me" was sampled by Meck in 2007, to provide the majority of the music for his single, "Feels Like Home". In 2008, Madonna used elements of Meck's version during "Like a Prayer" on the Sticky & Sweet Tour.

Other UK charting singles for Felix included "It Will Make Me Crazy" and "Stars".

"Don't You Want Me 2015" was released on Armada Music on 13 April 2015 and included five new mixes: "Classic", "Turbo", "Dimitri Vegas & Like Mike", "Atjazz Club" and "Brodanse Bass Hall".

In 2015, Felix launched his new label "DANCE FX" and all sales from his release of "Reaching for the top" were donated to the David Lynch Foundation.

Felix is currently working on new releases, but is also enjoying his time with his family.

Discography

Albums
1993: #1 – UK #26, AUS #124, AUT #24, GER #76, NED #86, SWE #45, SWI #29

Singles

See also
List of number-one dance hits (United States)
List of artists who reached number one on the US Dance chart
List of notable house music artists and releases

References

External links
 Discography  at franken.de
 
 Felix Facebook Fan Page
 Official Website

English DJs
English house musicians
English record producers
Remixers
English dance musicians
Living people
Year of birth missing (living people)
Musicians from Essex
Electronic dance music DJs